German submarine U-623 was a Type VIIC U-boat built for Nazi Germany's Kriegsmarine for service during World War II.
She was laid down on 15 July 1941 by Blohm & Voss, Hamburg as yard number 599, launched on 31 March 1942 and commissioned on 21 May 1942 under Oberleutnant zur See Hermann Schrüder.

Design
German Type VIIC submarines were preceded by the shorter Type VIIB submarines. U-623 had a displacement of  when at the surface and  while submerged. She had two shafts and two  propellers.

U-623 was fitted with five  torpedo tubes (four fitted at the bow and one at the stern), fourteen torpedoes, one  SK C/35 naval gun, 220 rounds, and a  C/30 anti-aircraft gun. The boat had a complement of between forty-four and sixty.

Service history
The boat's career began with training at 8th U-boat Flotilla on 21 May 1942, followed by active service on 1 December 1942 as part of the 6th Flotilla for the remainder of her service.

In two patrols she sank no ships.

Wolfpacks
U-623 took part in five wolfpacks, namely:
 Drachen (22 November – 3 December 1942)
 Panzer (3 – 9 December 1942)
 Ungestüm (11 – 13 December 1942)
 Raufbold (13 – 18 December 1942)
 Ritter (11 – 21 February 1943)

Fate
U-623 was caught while hurrying on the surface to join the attack against Convoy ON 166 and sunk on 21 February 1943 in the North Atlantic, at the position , by depth charges from a RAF Liberator of 120 Squadron. All hands were lost.

See also
 Convoy ON 166

References

Bibliography

External links

German Type VIIC submarines
1942 ships
U-boats commissioned in 1942
Ships lost with all hands
U-boats sunk in 1943
U-boats sunk by depth charges
U-boats sunk by British aircraft
World War II shipwrecks in the Atlantic Ocean
World War II submarines of Germany
Ships built in Hamburg
Maritime incidents in February 1943